Biochemical Society Transactions is a bimonthly peer-reviewed scientific journal which publishes the transactions of the annual conference and focused meetings of the Biochemical Society, together with independent meetings supported by the society. The society's annual symposium, previously published only in Biochemical Society Symposium, was first published in the Transactions in 2008. The journal was established in 1973 and is published by Portland Press, the Society's publishing arm.

The journal was issued quarterly until 1999. Since 2004, issues have been made up entirely of full papers, having previously alternated between an issue of abstracts and an issue of full papers. Transactions take the form of short papers, usually of 3–4 pages; the journal also publishes longer papers from the society's award lectures.

Since 2005, David J. Richardson (University of East Anglia) has been honorary editor. Colin Bingle is the editor-in-chief in 2020.  According to the Journal Citation Reports, the journal has a 2020 impact factor of 6.5.

References

External links 
 

Delayed open access journals
Publications established in 1973
Biochemistry journals
Bimonthly journals
Academic journals published by learned and professional societies
English-language journals